Beatriz Eugenia Yamamoto Cázarez (22 September 1957 – 8 February 2021) was a Mexican politician affiliated with the PAN. She served as Deputy of the LXII Legislature of the Mexican Congress representing Guanajuato.

She died of COVID-19 during the COVID-19 pandemic in Mexico.

References

1957 births
2021 deaths
Politicians from Guanajuato
People from León, Guanajuato
Women members of the Chamber of Deputies (Mexico)
National Action Party (Mexico) politicians
21st-century Mexican politicians
21st-century Mexican women politicians
Deaths from the COVID-19 pandemic in Mexico
People from Coahuila
Members of the Chamber of Deputies (Mexico) for Guanajuato